Presidente Venceslau is a municipality in the state of São Paulo in Brazil. The population is 39,583 (2020 est.) in an area of 755 km². The elevation is 422 m. The municipality was named after Venceslau Brás, former president of Brazil.

The municipality contains part of the  Rio do Peixe State Park, created in 2002.

References

Municipalities in São Paulo (state)